Congregational Church of Faribault (also known as the Plymouth Church) is a historic church at 227 3rd Street, NW in Faribault, Minnesota, United States.  It was built in 1867 and was added to the National Register of Historic Places in 1977.

References

Churches completed in 1867
Buildings and structures in Faribault, Minnesota
Churches in Rice County, Minnesota
Churches on the National Register of Historic Places in Minnesota
Romanesque Revival church buildings in Minnesota
National Register of Historic Places in Rice County, Minnesota